Lingguang Temple, may refer to:

 Lingguang Temple (Beijing), in Shijingshan District of Beijing, China
 Lingguang Temple (Meizhou), in Meixian District of Meizhou, Guangdong, China

Buddhist temple disambiguation pages